Sewee Mound (38CH45), also known as the Old Fort, is a historic mound located near Awendaw, South Carolina. It is one of 20 or more prehistoric shell rings located from the central coast of South Carolina to the central coast of Georgia. On average, it measures 149 feet in diameter and stands 10 feet high. The midden is largely composed of oyster shell. A smaller midden is located nearby.

It was listed on the National Register of Historic Places in 1970.

References

Archaeological sites on the National Register of Historic Places in South Carolina
Buildings and structures in Charleston County, South Carolina
National Register of Historic Places in Charleston County, South Carolina
Shell rings